Baghelah may refer to various villages in Iran:

Baghelah-ye Olya, Ilam
Baghelah-ye Olya, Lorestan
Baghelah-ye Sofla